Goodbye to the Gallows is the debut full-length studio album by Emmure, released through Victory Records in the UK on March 5, 2007, and in the US on March 6. A vinyl reissue of the album was also released by Victory in 2013.

The two guitarists on this release play 7 strings in Drop A# tuning (Drop Bb), which makes this and The Respect Issue the only Emmure albums to feature these tunings.

Track listing

Song title information
According to early album art, "Rusted Over Wet Dreams" was originally titled "Scorpios With Black Names Are Bad News".
Track 6, titled "Travis Bickle" is a reference to the Martin Scorsese film Taxi Driver.
Tracks 3 and 8 are derived from the comedy program Chappelle's Show, the former being a reference to the title of a recurring sketch, and the latter a recurring quote by a character in a sketch respectively.
The title of Track 5, "You Got a Henna Tattoo that Said Forever" is a reference to a quote from Zach Galifianakis' 2001 episode of Comedy Central Presents.
Track 7, "Sleeping Princess in Devil's Castle" is a take on the Dragon Ball film of the same name.

Personnel
Emmure
 Frankie Palmeri - lead vocals
 Jesse Ketive - lead guitar, programming
 Ben Lionetti - rhythm guitar
 Mark Davis - bass guitar
 Joe Lionetti - drums

Production
 Produced, engineered and mixed by Chris "Zeuss" Harris
 Mastered by Alan Douches
 Art direction, layout, band logo and illustrations by Paul Friemel

References

2007 debut albums
Emmure albums
Victory Records albums
Albums produced by Chris "Zeuss" Harris